The Chalands de débarquement d'infanterie et de chars (CDIC) were two tank landing ships that operated in the French Navy. In 2011 Rapière was among a package of four ships sold to the Chilean Navy and renamed Canave.

Design and description

The CDIC landing craft were improved versions of the Engin de débarquement d'infanterie et de chars (EDIC) vessels that had been constructed from the 1950s to the 1980s. They were designed to work with the  ships of the French Navy and take infantry and vehicles from the landing platforms to the shore. They have a complement of 18 including one officer. They mount two 20 mm modèle F2 guns and two  machine guns. The wheelhouse can be lowered so that the vessels can dock more easily.

Ships in class

Construction and career
Two CDIC ships were ordered for construction by SFCN at Villeneuve-la-Garenne, France, the same site as the last two EDIC vessels had been constructed. There had been more planned orders but delays with the Foudre class prevented any of them being placed. Initially named CDIC 9061 and CDIC 9062, the two landing craft were commissioned on 28 July 1988 and 2 March 1989. They were given their new names of Rapière and Halleberde on 21 July 1997. Rapière was renamed Canave in Chilean service. Beginning in 2013, Halleberde was used to supply the Île du Levant, an island in the Mediterranean Sea off Toulon. On 4 September 2014, Halleberde was taken out of service and placed in a state of ready reserve with the Amphibious Flotilla.

Citations

References

External links

 Photography gallery, French Ministry of Defence.

 

Amphibious warfare vessel classes
Cold War amphibious warfare vessels of France
Amphibious warfare vessels of France
Ship classes of the French Navy